Beaumont is a city in Riverside County, California, United States, located at the summit of the San Gorgonio Pass, between the San Bernardino Mountains and Mount San Gorgonio to the north, and the San Jacinto Mountains and San Jacinto Peak to the south. Early native American inhabitants included the Serrano and Cahuilla people, who still live on reservation lands in the area.

Beaumont is bordered on the east by the city of Banning, on the south by the city of San Jacinto, on the west by the city of Calimesa, and on the north by the unincorporated community of Cherry Valley.

History

Etymology

Beaumont, French for "Beautiful Mountain", received its name in 1887 from Henry C. Sigler, president of the Southern California Investment Company, for its view of Mount San Jacinto.

Early History

During the early 1850s, several surveying parties passed through the vicinity of present-day Beaumont in search of a pass that would connect the east to the Pacific Ocean. The San Gorgonio Pass was first surveyed in 1853 during an expedition under Lieutenant R.S. Williamson, who was sent by the United States government. Its location enthralled many who now saw that connecting to the ocean was a feasible measure and led to plans for constructing a railway from the Missouri River to the Pacific. By the early 1860s, stagecoach lines were providing service through the pass area, and a stage stop was established, named Edgar Station, after a physician from one of the expedition parties who made his home in the area.

In 1875 when the Southern Pacific Railroad laid tracks through the modern-day location of Beaumont, they established a rail station named Summit Station. This served as a rest stop for railway travelers from the Mojave Desert on their way to the Los Angeles vicinity. In 1884 a real estate development company established a town named San Gorgonio. A second real estate development company purchased the town in 1887 and renamed the town Beaumont, which was incorporated on November 18, 1912.

By 1927, the small city had a population of 857 with five churches, a public library, a bank, a high school, two local newspapers, several lumber yards, commercial packing houses, and a dehydrating plant. The city, one of Riverside County's largest apple growers, was dubbed "the land of the big red apple" by local residents in its early years. Apple orchards in the area expanded to a $200,000 industry by 1930. Beaumont saw a rise in visitors and residents as the nearby city of Palm Springs grew to become a highly popular resort spot during and after the 1930s; Beaumont followed suit and attempted to capitalize on the increasing tourism by establishing guest ranches. According to an early 1930s/1940s postcard, the Highland Springs Guest Ranch of Beaumont offered its patrons horseback riding, tennis, archery, horseshoes, swimming, shuffle-board, ping pong, baseball, ballroom dancing, massages, basketball, and lodging accommodations.

20th century growth
During the Cold War, a Lockheed rocket test site operated by Simi Valley–based Rocketdyne was established south of the town in Potrero Canyon. In late 2003, the majority of the Potrero Canyon site was sold to the state of California. Toxic chemicals used in rocket fuel and site test activities have been found in the soil and groundwater at the site, and planning is underway to begin cleanup sometime in the next few years. Plans are being developed by the California Department of Fish and Game to allow public access.

With the housing boom in the early decade, the urban sprawl reached the last remaining valleys of the Inland Empire. Since 2000, with Beaumont's proximity to Los Angeles, various Southern California residents have moved to the San Gorgonio Pass region for its low housing cost, causing a 20% jump in the city's population, making it the fastest growing city in the state. This has concerned many local residents who cite increasing student population in schools, rising demand on the water supply, and increasing traffic through the city on Interstate 10 in both directions. A 2008 study by the Public Policy Institute of California noted that Beaumont and its neighboring communities in the nearby San Jacinto Valley have registered the highest population growth throughout Riverside County and that the region was projected to increase by 4.5% a year to 310,000 by 2015.

Beaumont is home to many master-planned communities. The following communities are currently under construction or have been built: Oak Valley Greens, Three Rings Ranch, Solera by Del Webb (later sold to Pulte Homes Inc.), Olivewood by Taylor Morrison, Sundance and Tournament Hills by Pardee Homes, Four Seasons by K. Hovnanian and Fairway Canyon. Except for Oak Valley Greens, these communities operate under HOAs and are similar to developments in Redlands, Rancho Cucamonga, and some Orange County suburbs.

Corruption allegations
In May 2016, prosecutors announced that they were charging almost all of Beaumont's former government leadership with corruption they said had been going on for three decades. Seven former officials were arrested and charged with stealing nearly $43 million from city coffers. Former City Manager Alan Kapanicas, former Economic Development Director David William Dillon, former Public Works Director Deepak Moorjani, former Planning Director Ernest Alois Egger, former Finance Director William Kevin Aylward, former City Atty. Joseph Sandy Aklufi and former Police Chief Francis Dennis Coe Jr. were accused of using their public offices to enrich themselves personally and secure interest-free loans for friends and colleagues with taxpayer money. Bail for Kapanicas, Aylward, Aklufi, Dillon, Moorjani and Egger was set at $5 million each, while Coe's bail was set at $100,000. The criminal probe began in April 2015 when investigators with the Riverside County district attorney's office and the FBI raided City Hall and seized records, computers and other items. All seven defendants pleaded guilty to offenses in plea bargains during 2017-2018.

Geography
Beaumont's neighboring cities are Banning to the east and Calimesa to the northwest.

With an elevation of 2,500-3,000 feet above sea level, Beaumont is at the peak on the San Gorgonio Pass between San Bernardino and Palm Springs, neighboring the Interstate 10 and State Route 60 freeways. If driving east to Banning or west to Calimesa, drivers can feel a gradual downward slope.

Climate
Beaumont reaches an average high of  during the summer and an average low of  during the winter. Due to its higher elevation, it is usually 5-10 degrees Fahrenheit cooler than its neighboring lower-elevation cities, such as Moreno Valley, Hemet, San Jacinto, and the Palm Springs desert area. Snow does fall, but it usually doesn't stick for more than a couple of hours. According to the Köppen Climate Classification system, Beaumont has a Hot-summer Mediterranean climate, abbreviated "Csa" on climate maps.

Beaumont's slightly cooler temperatures and less smoggy air, compared to its neighboring lower-elevation cities, make it a desirable area for development in the Inland Empire region. However, it is one of the windiest cities in Southern California, along with San Bernardino, Fontana, and Victorville.

Annual precipitation is approximately 19 inches.

Demographics

2010
The 2010 United States Census reported that Beaumont had a population of 36,877. The racial makeup of Beaumont was 23,163 (62.8%) White (42.9% Non-Hispanic White), 2,276 (6.2%) African American, 544 (1.5%) Native American, 2,845 (7.7%) Asian, 83 (0.2%) Pacific Islander, 6,058 (16.4%) from other races, and 1,908 (5.2%) from two or more races. Hispanic or Latino of any race were 14,864 persons (40.3%).

The Census reported that 36,403 people (98.7% of the population) lived in households, 263 (0.7%) lived in non-institutionalized group quarters, and 211 (0.6%) were institutionalized.

There were 11,801 households, out of which 5,341 (45.3%) had children under the age of 18 living in them, 7,152 (60.6%) were opposite-sex married couples living together, 1,452 (12.3%) had a female householder with no husband present, 708 (6.0%) had a male householder with no wife present. There were 767 (6.5%) unmarried opposite-sex partnerships, and 106 (0.9%) same-sex married couples or partnerships; 1,906 households (16.2%) were made up of individuals, and 695 (5.9%) had someone living alone who was 65 years of age or older. The average household size was 3.08. There were 9,312 families (78.9% of all households); the average family size was 3.44.

The population was spread out, with 11,121 people (30.2%) under the age of 18, 2,904 people (7.9%) aged 18 to 24, 11,058 people (30.0%) aged 25 to 44, 7,905 people (21.4%) aged 45 to 64, and 3,889 people (10.5%) who were 65 years of age or older. The median age was 32.5 years. For every 100 females, there were 95.2 males. For every 100 females age 18 and over, there were 91.1 males.

The homeowner vacancy rate was 4.3%; the rental vacancy rate was 5.9%. 26,871 people (72.9% of the population) lived in owner-occupied housing units and 9,532 people (25.8%) lived in rental housing units.

According to the 2010 United States Census, Beaumont had a median household income of $67,758, with 11.2% of the population living below the federal poverty line.

2000
As of the census of 2000, there were 11,384 people, 3,881 households, and 2,782 families residing in the city. The racial makeup of the city was 68.1% White, 2.9% Black or African American, 2.3% Native American, 1.7% Asian, 0.1% Pacific Islander, 20.3% from other races, and 4.6% from two or more races. Hispanic or Latino of any race were 36.2% of the population.

There were 3,881 households, 42.6% of them with children under the age of 18; 47.3% were married couples living together, 17.8% had a female householder with no husband present, and 28.3% were non-families. Single individuals made up 22.3% of all households, and 9.2% had someone living alone who was 65 years of age or older. The average household size was 2.9 persons and the average family size was 3.4.

In the city, the population was spread out, with 33.0% under the age of 18, 9.9% from 18 to 24, 29.1% from 25 to 44, 17.3% from 45 to 64, and 10.7% who were 65 years of age or older. The median age was 30 years. For every 100 females, there were 91.6 males. For every 100 females age 18 and over, there were 88.1 males.

The median income for a household in the city was $40,295 in 2007. Males had a median income of $30,829 versus $20,613 for females. The per capita income for the city was $14,141. About 17.8% of families and 20.2% of the population were below the poverty line, including 28.9% of those under age 18 and 10.3% of those age 65 or over.

Economy
There are several big box stores in town, including Walmart, The Home Depot, and Kohl's which are all located in the 2nd Street Marketplace. Other major businesses in the 2nd Street Marketplace area include Best Buy, Bed Bath & Beyond, Petco, ALDI, Ross Dress for Less, Dollar Tree, Grocery Outlet, Five Below, ULTA Beauty, Planet Fitness, Chase, Wells Fargo, Chili's,  In-N-Out Burger, Raising Cane’s, Sonic Drive-In, Rite-Aid, Jersey Mike's Subs, Pieology, and Panera Bread. There is also a movie theater, known as the 2nd Street Cinema.

Government

Local government 
The current mayor and council members are:

 Mayor: Lloyd White 
 Mayor Pro Tem: Julio Martinez III 
 Council Members: Mike Lara, David Fenn, and Rey Santos

State and federal 

In the United States House of Representatives, Beaumont is in California's 36th congressional district, as a result of redistricting in 2012.  The district is represented by Democrat Raul Ruiz, who defeated Mary Bono in 2012, after redistricting reassigned her seat from the District 44 to District 36.  In 2014, Democrat Raul Ruiz defeated Republican Brian Nestande 54.2 percent to 45.8 percent.  Prior to the 2012 General Election, Beaumont was in District 41, represented by Republican Jerry Lewis.  Lewis announced his retirement before the election, which was contested by Republican John Tavaglione and Democrat Mark Takano who won the new (redistricted) seat.

Education
The Beaumont Unified School District has schools within city limits and in the neighboring community of Cherry Valley.
 High schools: Beaumont, Glen View (continuation)
 Middle schools: Mountain View, San Gorgonio, Highland Academy Charter School
 K-8 schools: Summerwind Trails
 Elementary schools: Anna Hause, Brookside, Highland Springs, Palm Avenue, Sundance, Starlight, Three Rings Ranch and Tournament Hills

Infrastructure

Public safety
The California Highway Patrol has a regional office on the Beaumont side of Highland Springs Avenue (its jurisdiction goes from Calimesa to the west to Desert Hot Springs to the east, as well as Hemet and San Jacinto to the south).

Law enforcement is provided by the Beaumont Police Department.

The City of Beaumont contracts for fire and paramedic services with the Riverside County Fire Department through a cooperative agreement with CAL FIRE. Station 66 of the City of Beaumont Fire Services maintains two type 1 engines and one paramedic squad.

Public library
The Beaumont Library District, a California special district, independent of both city and county government, provides library services to Beaumont and Cherry Valley.

Cemeteries
Mountain View Cemetery (also known as the Beaumont Cemetery) was established as the Beaumont Public Cemetery District in 1927. It began as a family cemetery for the Osburn family in 1843 and is now operated by the Summit Cemetery District. The district also operates the Stewart Sunnyslope Cemetery which was developed from land donated to the city in 1888.

Parks and recreation
In addition to the parks and recreational activities provided by the city's own Parks and Recreation Department, additional services are provided by the Beaumont-Cherry Valley Recreation and Park District.

Local recreational possibilities include two golf courses: the Tukwet Canyon and Oak Valley Golf Clubs.

The nearby Highland Springs Resort, established in 1884, hosts Southern California's largest certified organic lavender farm at 123 Farm, the Annual Lavender Festival in June, the Annual Sausage and Beer Festival in August, and the Annual Olive & Wine Faire in October. Beaumont is home to the Annual Cherry Festival, which celebrated its 100th anniversary from May 31 to June 3, 2018.

Notable people
 Tracy Caldwell Dyson, NASA astronaut, graduate of Beaumont High School (1987)
 Scott Haskin, professional basketball player, grew up in Beaumont.
 Brion James, actor  
 George Wagner, professional wrestler known as "Gorgeous George", had a  turkey ranch in Beaumont in the late 1950s to early 1960s.
 Amir Zaki, American photographic and video artist

In popular culture
The 1995 movie How to Make an American Quilt filmed many of its driving scenes through Beaumont. Local wildlife in the surrounding vicinity include quail, coyotes, and foxes. The town has been home to different antique store establishments dating back several decades, such as the now defunct Nettie and Alice Museum of Hobbies.

A few episodes of the TV show My Name Is Earl were filmed in Beaumont, as well as many of the show's opening scenes; the liquor store where he buys the winning lotto ticket, the car wash, and the scene where Earl gets hit by a car were all filmed near the intersection of 6th Street and Pennsylvania Avenue.

References

Further reading

External links

 City of Beaumont official website
 San Gorgonio Pass Historical Society

 
1912 establishments in California
Bradshaw Trail
Cities in Riverside County, California
Incorporated cities and towns in California
Populated places established in 1912